Singapore competed in the 2017 Asian Winter Games in Sapporo and Obihiro, Japan from February 19 to 26. After competing with just one athlete in their Asian Winter Games debut, the country is sent twenty-two athletes in two sports (three disciplines).

Short track speed skater Lucas Ng was the country's flagbearer during the parade of nations at the opening ceremony.

Background
This will be the second multi-sport event (after the 2016 Asian Beach Games, where Singapore competed under the code of SGP, after changing it in late 2016 from SIN.

Competitors
The following table lists the Singaporen delegation per sport and gender.

Figure skating

Singapore competed in the figure skating competition for the first time ever. The team consisted of two female athletes competing in the ladies individual event. Shuran finished in sixth place overall, the highest placement of the team at the Games, and her teammate, Ing finished in eleventh place.

Individual

Ice hockey

The Singaporean hockey competed in division one. This also marked the country's debut in the sport of ice hockey at the Asian Winter Games. Singapore finished in sixth and last place (10th place overall) in division one of the competition.

Men's tournament

Singapore was represented by the following 18 athletes:

Eugene Chin (G)
Kenny Liang (G)
Ang Yu-jin (D)
Chen Pei-huan  (D)
Chew Wee (D)
Samuel Lim (D)
Joewe Lam (D)
Loh Chee-seng (C) (D)
Richard O'Brien (D)
Chiong Woon-lip (F)
Benjamin Huang (F)
Lam Kin-yu (A) (F)
Gabriel Lau (F)
Joshua Lee (F)
Liu Zhi-yang (F)
Siah Ming-zhe (F)	
Peter Tan (F)
Ryan Tan (F)

Legend: G = Goalie, D = Defense, F = Forward, C = Captain, A = Assistant captain

Short track speed skating

Singapore entered two athletes (one male and one female) in the short track speed skating competitions.

See also
Singapore at the 2018 Winter Olympics

References

Nations at the 2017 Asian Winter Games
Asian Winter Games
Singapore at the Asian Winter Games